George Bell Timmerman Sr. (March 28, 1881 – April 22, 1966) was a United States district judge of the United States District Court for the Eastern District of South Carolina and the United States District Court for the Western District of South Carolina.

Education and career

Born in Edgefield County, South Carolina, Timmerman received a Bachelor of Laws from the University of South Carolina School of Law in 1902, where he was also head coach of the South Carolina Gamecocks baseball team. He was in private practice in Lexington, South Carolina from 1902 to 1942, serving as a solicitor for the 5th Judicial Circuit of South Carolina from 1905 to 1908 and the 11th Judicial Circuit of South Carolina from 1908 to 1920. He was also a member of the South Carolina House of Representatives from 1923 to 1924.

Federal judicial service

Timmerman was nominated by President Franklin D. Roosevelt on December 18, 1941, to a joint seat on the United States District Court for the Eastern District of South Carolina and the United States District Court for the Western District of South Carolina vacated by Judge Alva M. Lumpkin. He was confirmed by the United States Senate on January 20, 1942, and received his commission on January 23, 1942. He served as Chief Judge of the Eastern District from 1952 to 1962. He assumed senior status on October 10, 1962. He was reassigned by operation of law to the United States District Court for the District of South Carolina on October 7, 1965, pursuant to 79 Stat. 951. His service terminated on April 22, 1966, due to his death in Columbia, South Carolina.

Family

Timmerman's son, George Bell Timmerman Jr., became Governor of South Carolina and a state circuit judge in South Carolina.

References

Sources
 

1881 births
1966 deaths
Members of the South Carolina House of Representatives
Judges of the United States District Court for the Western District of South Carolina
Judges of the United States District Court for the Eastern District of South Carolina
United States district court judges appointed by Franklin D. Roosevelt
20th-century American judges
South Carolina Gamecocks baseball coaches
People from Edgefield County, South Carolina
People from Lexington, South Carolina